Naa Ninna Bidalaare is a 1979 Indian Kannada-language horror film directed by Vijay and produced by C. Jayaram. The film stars Anant Nag and Lakshmi. The film was remade in Hindi as Mangalsutra, with Anant Nag reprising his role while Rekha appeared in the role played by Lakshmi. Na Ninna Bidalaare is regarded as one of best horror films of all time in the Kannada film industry. Na Ninna Bidalaare is the first movie where Anant Nag and Lakshmi acted together, later the pair become one of the finest onscreen couples in Indian cinema.

Plot 
Krishna (Anant Nag) gets possessed by the ghost of his ex-lover Kamini (K. Vijaya) whose love he had refused. The rest of the film revolves around Krishnav's wife Gayatri's (Lakshmi) efforts to save her husband from danger.

Cast 
 Anant Nag as Krishna
 Lakshmi as Gayatri
 K.Vijaya as Kamini
 Master Prakash
 K. S. Ashwath as Krishna's father
 Leelavathi as Gayatri's mother
 Balakrishna as Gayatri's father
 Musuri Krishnamurthy
 M. S. Satya
 Shivaprakash

Soundtrack 

The music of the film was composed by the duo Rajan–Nagendra, with lyrics penned by Chi. Udaya Shankar.

Track list

Box-office 
Na Ninna Bidalaare ran for 100 days at many centres across the Karnataka and it became one of the highest grossing Kannada films of the year 1979.

Awards 
Filmfare Award for Best Actor Kannada (1979) – Anant Nag for "Na Ninna Bidalaare"

References

External links 
 

1979 films
1970s Kannada-language films
Indian horror films
Films scored by Rajan–Nagendra
Kannada films remade in other languages
Indian ghost films
1979 horror films
Films directed by Vijay (director)